Who Do You Think You Are? is a British genealogy documentary series that has aired on the BBC since 2004, in which celebrity participants trace their family history. It is made by the production company Wall to Wall. The programme has regularly attracted an audience of more than 6 million viewers. More than ten international adaptations of the programme have been produced.

Episodes

The first two series were broadcast on BBC Two and the first was the channel's highest-rating programme of 2004. This led to episodes being shown on BBC One from the third series onwards. The current narrator, as of Series 14 in 2017, is Phil Davis. Mark Strong took over from David Morrissey after the first series, which was nominated for "Best Factual Series or Strand" in the 2005 BAFTAs. Cherie Lunghi was the narrator between Series 10 and 13.

In the first series, the last ten minutes of each episode featured presenter Adrian Chiles and genealogical researcher Nick Barratt giving tips on tracing a family tree. In 2007, a special episode was broadcast in conjunction with the BBC's "Family Wanted" campaign featuring Nicky Campbell, who was adopted when he was just a few days old.

The theme tune was composed by Mark Sayer-Wade, who also provided the background music for earlier episodes. The music in later episodes is provided by Julian Hamlin and Edmund Jolliffe.

Other countries

The TV format of the series has proved popular around the world and the BBC has licensed it to many foreign television companies who have produced their own individual versions. TVP1 has aired a Polish version, called , which was broadcast from November 2006 to March 2007. In September 2007, a series of a Canadian version, consisting of 13 episodes, aired on CBC Television. In 2015, Radio-Canada produced a French-language version called  An Australian version aired on SBS in January 2008 after six episodes of the BBC version had been shown. The BBC programmes were those featuring Stephen Fry, Bill Oddie, Julia Sawalha, Jeremy Clarkson, Gurinder Chadha and Nigella Lawson. In 2008, ARD's Das Erste aired the German version, called  ("The secret of my family"). They aired four episodes featuring Marie-Luise Marjan, Armin Rohde, Christine Neubauer and Peter Maffay. Ireland's national broadcaster RTÉ has aired three series of Irish version of Who Do You Think You Are? in autumn 2008, 2009 and, after a considerable gap, 2018. The Irish version has included internationally recognised names such as Ardal O'Hanlon, Dana Scallon, Rosanna Davison and Diarmuid Gavin.

Sveriges Television, the Swedish public service broadcaster, aired a Swedish version called  in 2009. Later that year, in May and June, they also aired the BBC episodes featuring Stephen Fry, Jeremy Irons, Nigella Lawson, John Hurt and Jane Horrocks. On 31 May 2009, South African station SABC2 premiered its own version, split into two parts, featuring local personalities. An American adaptation of the programme premiered on 5 March 2010 on NBC. In Britain, it began airing on BBC One on 13 June 2010.

In 2010, the Dutch version called  ("Hidden Past") of the programme started. Thus far, fifteen series have been produced between 2010 and 2022. From 2005 to 2008, four series of the programme  ("Distant Relatives") were broadcast on Dutch television. In September 2010, the Danish TV station Danmarks Radio aired the first episode of the Danish version, called . On 1 September 2010, France 2 aired two episodes of the French version, featuring Vincent Pérez and Clémentine Célarié. Since then, four other episodes have aired, starring François Berléand, Sonia Rolland, Barbara Schulz and Franck Dubosc.

In January 2011, the Norwegian TV station NRK began airing the Norwegian version, called . Starting on 9 January 2012, Finland's national public broadcasting company, YLE, has aired 15 episodes of the Finnish version, called , in which local public figures searched for their origins. A furthering of the concept was developed for American public broadcast TV, called Finding Your Roots with Henry Louis Gates. This series adds DNA profiling to the format including Y-chromosome DNA, mitochondrial DNA and autosomal DNA analysis to infer both ancient and recent genetic relationships. The series began airing on 25 March 2012. In January 2013, Czech broadcaster ČT began broadcasting their own version of the programme, called  ("The secret of the lineage").

Starting on 15 January 2013, RTP1 broadcast a Portuguese version called  ("Who Do You Think You Are?") at the 10:30 pm timeslot. The first series featured the comedian Herman José, the actresses Maria do Céu Guerra and Maria João Abreu, the musician Zé Pedro from the Xutos & Pontapés rock band and the fadista Camané.

In 2015, Rede Globo launched its own version of the show, entitled A Origem das Estrelas (The Origin of the Stars). It was released as part of the variety show Estrelas, presented by Angélica. The first celebrity to participate was Miguel Falabella.

International versions

Similar programmes
BBC Cymru Wales has a similar series called Coming Home, made by Yellow Duck Productions, which features celebrities with a Welsh background. In 2007, Wall to Wall Media developed You Don't Know You're Born for ITV1. The series saw various celebrities taking on their ancestors' jobs. UKTV broadcast My Famous Family in 2007.

A short parody sketch of the programme featured in the first series of The Armstrong & Miller Show in which Alexander Armstrong plays a fictionalised version of himself, discovering that his paternal grandfather and maternal grandmother were a child molester and a brothel-owner respectively.

Another parody sketch of the programme featured in Walliams & Friend in which Harry Enfield plays Queen Elizabeth II, who attempts to trace her family lineage.

Home media

DVDs
Series 1–11, 13, 15 and 16 of Who Do You Think You Are? are all available on Region 2 DVD, whilst a box set of series 1–4 is available, distributed by Acorn Media UK. Series 1–4 are available on Region 4 DVD.

Magazines
In October 2007, BBC Magazines began issuing Who Do You Think You Are? Magazine, a monthly publication that includes material from the TV series.

Awards and nominations
The programme was nominated for the 2010 BAFTA Television Award for Best Factual Series.

Notes

References

External links

Who Do You Think You Are? Magazine BBC
Who Do You Think You Are? Story

2004 British television series debuts
2000s British documentary television series
2010s British documentary television series
2020s British documentary television series
BBC television documentaries
Television series about family history
Television series by Warner Bros. Television Studios
English-language television shows
British genealogy